Acanthocinus leechi is a species of longhorn beetles of the subfamily Lamiinae. It was described by Lawrence S. Dillon in 1956.

References

Beetles described in 1956
Acanthocinus